Salim Mohammed (born 9 September 1946) is a former Trinidad cyclist. He competed in the team pursuit at the 1968 Summer Olympics.

References

1946 births
Living people
Trinidad and Tobago male cyclists
Olympic cyclists of Trinidad and Tobago
Cyclists at the 1968 Summer Olympics
20th-century Trinidad and Tobago people